North Mercer County R-III School District, also known as North Mercer School District, is a school district headquartered in Mercer, Missouri. It has a single K-12 school, North Mercer School.

The district is in Mercer County and includes Mercer and a portion of Ravanna.

History
, Dan Owens is the superintendent; his contract was extended by the school board in 2020. Additionally, there is one principal for all grades, Wes Guilkey. His contract was extended in 2020, and his contract was still in place as of 2021.

Academics
In 1995, Lineville-Clio Community School District students taking Spanish classes did so at the school in Mercer.

Athletics
In 2005 the district made a sports team sharing arrangement with the Princeton School District, so North Mercer handles boys' softball for both districts, while Princeton handles American football.

References

External links
 North Mercer School District

School districts in Missouri
Mercer County, Missouri